Mezhdurechensky District is the name of several administrative and municipal districts in Russia:
Mezhdurechensky District, Kemerovo Oblast, an administrative district of Kemerovo Oblast
Mezhdurechensky District, Vologda Oblast, an administrative and municipal district of Vologda Oblast

See also
Mezhdurechensky (disambiguation)

Citations